Kalt in Iran may refer to:
 Kalt, Khuzestan
 Kalt-e Olya, West Azerbaijan Province
 Kalt-e Sofla, West Azerbaijan Province